South Sudan was set to compete at the 2015 World Championships in Athletics in Beijing, China, from 22 to 30 August 2015. However, their only athlete did not show up in Beijing.

Results
(q – qualified, NM – no mark, SB – season best)

Men
Track and road events

References

Nations at the 2015 World Championships in Athletics
World Championships in Athletics
South Sudan at the World Championships in Athletics